Stephanostegia capuronii is a species of plant in the family Apocynaceae. It is endemic to Madagascar.

The Latin specific epithet of capuronii is in honor of the French botanist René Capuron. It was first published in Adansonia, n.s., Vol.12 on page 219 in 1972.

References

capuronii
Endemic flora of Madagascar
Near threatened flora of Africa
Taxonomy articles created by Polbot
Plants described in 1972